Berliner is a surname. Notable people with the surname include:

Abraham Berliner, German theologian and historian
Alain Berliner, Belgian director
Alan Berliner, American filmmaker
Arnold Berliner
David Berliner, educational psychologist and professor of education at Arizona State University
Emile Berliner (1851–1929), German-American inventor
Hans Berliner (1929–2017), former World Correspondence Chess Champion
Henry Berliner, United States aircraft and helicopter pioneer, son of Emile Berliner
Janet Berliner, Bram Stoker Award-winning author
Max Berliner, Polish-born Jewish Argentine actor
Paul Berliner (ethnomusicologist), professor at Duke University
Paul Berliner (trader), trader who settled charges of market manipulation with the Securities and Exchange Commission
Trude Berliner, Jewish actress forced to flee Europe when the Nazis came to power

Jewish surnames